The following highways are numbered 350:

Canada
Manitoba Provincial Road 350
 New Brunswick Route 350
Newfoundland and Labrador Route 350
Prince Edward Island Route 350
 Quebec Route 350
Saskatchewan Highway 350

Japan
 Japan National Route 350

United States
  U.S. Route 350
  Arkansas Highway 350
  Georgia State Route 350 (former)
  Indiana State Road 350
  Louisiana Highway 350
  Maryland Route 350
  Mississippi Highway 350
  Missouri Route 350
 New York:
  New York State Route 350
  County Route 350 (Erie County, New York)
  Ohio State Route 350
  Oregon Route 350
  Pennsylvania Route 350
  Tennessee State Route 350
 Texas:
  Texas State Highway 350
  Farm to Market Road 350
  Virginia State Route 350
 Virginia State Route 350 (former)
  Wyoming Highway 350